This is a list of notable gardens in Wales, open to the public either regularly or by appointment.

Anglesey
Carreglwyd, Llanfaethlu
Cestyll Garden
Plas Cadnant
Plas Newydd

Carmarthenshire
Aberglasney Gardens
Dinefwr Park 
National Botanic Garden of Wales
Norwood Gardens
Llwyngarreg Gardens

Ceredigion
Cae Hir Gardens
Hafod Uchtryd
Llanerchaeron

Clwyd
Bodelwyddan Castle
Bodnant Garden 
Bodrhyddan Hall
Bodysgallen Hall 
Chirk Castle
Erddig 
Gwydir Castle
Happy Valley Gardens
Haulfre Gardens
Plas Teg

Glamorgan
Bryngarw Country Park
Bute Park
Cefn Onn Country Park
Clyne Gardens
Dyffryn Gardens
Margam Country Park
Roath Park
St. Fagans Castle
Singleton Park

Gwynedd
Parc Glynllifon
Penrhyn Castle 
Plas Tan y Bwlch
Plas Brondanw
Plas yn Rhiw 
Portmeirion
Treborth Botanic Garden

Monmouthshire
Bedwellty House
Dewstow House
High Glanau
Llanover Park
Penpergwm Lodge
Tredegar House Country Park
Veddw House, Devauden

Pembrokeshire
Colby Woodland Garden 
Ffynone
Hilton Court Gardens
Picton Castle
Upton Castle, Cosheston
Dyffryn Fernant, Fishguard

Powys
Abbey Cwmhir Hall
Glansevern Hall
Gliffaes, near Tretower
Gregynog Hall
Maesfron Hall, Trewern
Penpont, Trallong
Powis Castle 
 Rock Park, Llandrindod Wells
Treberfydd
Tretower Court

See also

List of gardens
Gardens in England
Gardens in Scotland
Gardens in Northern Ireland
List of botanical gardens
Conservation in the United Kingdom